Edgar Howard Schwager (December 3, 1909 – April 25, 1992) was an American football player and coach and college athletics administrator. He was a star athlete at Whitewater State Teachers College, competing in basketball, football, and track and field.  He led the basketball team in scoring three years in a row and was captain of Whitewater's 1929–30 basketball team.  He was the head coach for the Whitewater football team in 1942 and from 1946 to 1955. He also served as the school's basketball coach from 1942 to 1944 and 1946 to 1948, baseball coach from 1955 to 1959, track coach from 1946 to 1953, and athletic director from 1942 to 1971.  Prior to 1942, he had been a coach at Dodgeville and Oconomowoc High Schools. He served in the United States Navy during World War II.  He died in 1992 and was buried at the Hillside Cemetery in Whitewater, Wisconsin.  He was posthumously inducted into the Wisconsin Intercollegiate Athletic Conference Hall of Fame in 2015.

Head coaching record

Football

References

External links
 

1909 births
1992 deaths
Wisconsin–Whitewater Warhawks athletic directors
Wisconsin–Whitewater Warhawks baseball coaches
Wisconsin–Whitewater Warhawks football coaches
Wisconsin–Whitewater Warhawks football players
Wisconsin–Whitewater Warhawks men's basketball coaches
College men's track and field athletes in the United States
College track and field coaches in the United States
United States Navy personnel of World War II